Anthony Brian Watts FRS is a British marine geologist and geophysicist and Professor of Marine Geology and Geophysics in the Department of Earth Sciences, at the University of Oxford.

Education
Watts was born in Essex and educated at Sidcot School, a Quaker school in Somerset, and University College, London where he earned a Bachelor of Science degree in Geology and Physics in 1967. He also earned a PhD in Marine Geophysics from University of Durham in 1970 supervised by Professor Martin H. P. Bott and a Doctor of Science from the University of Oxford in 2003.

Career
Watts has taught at the Lamont–Doherty Earth Observatory of Columbia University and the University of Oxford and has published more than 240 research articles in peer-reviewed scientific journals and a book on Isostasy and Flexure of the Lithosphere.

Research
According to Watts:

Awards and honours
Watts has received a number of awards including the Murchison Medal of the Geological Society of London, the George P. Woollard Award of the Geological Society of America and the Arthur Holmes Medal of the European Geosciences Union. Watts was elected a Fellow of the Royal Society (FRS) in 2014, his nomination reads: 

Watts is also an Honorary Member of the European Geosciences Union and a Fellow of the American Geophysical Union, the Geological Society of America and an elected Member of the Academia Europaea (MAE). He was the 2015 Harold Jeffreys Lecturer of the Royal Astronomical Society and in 2020 the recipient of the US Navy and American Geophysical Union Maurice Ewing Medal.

References

British geologists
British geophysicists
Fellows of the Royal Society
Living people
Fellows of the American Geophysical Union
Fellows of the Geological Society of America
Fellows of Wolfson College, Oxford
Members of Academia Europaea
1945 births
Alumni of University College London
Alumni of Durham University Graduate Society
Marine geophysicists